Prodipto Ghosh was an Indian civil servant and administrator. He was the administrator of Mahe from  9 August 1972 to 7 June 1973.

References 

 

Year of birth missing
Possibly living people
Administrators of Mahe